Lake Bowen or Lake William C. Bowen is a  reservoir in northern Spartanburg County, South Carolina,  from the North Carolina border. The Interstate 26 bridge crosses over Lake Bowen between exits 5 and 10 on Interstate 26. The lake stretches parallel to South Carolina Highway 11. The lake is formed by the waters of the South Pacolet River to serve as a public drinking water supply. Rules and regulations were adopted for recreational activities like boating and fishing. There are picnic pavilions, boat ramps, and a playground near the lake. Fish from the lake is safe to eat.

Gallery

References

External links
Lake Bowen review on South Carolina Lakes Database

Bowen
Bowen
Bowen